Mohammad Ali Faramarzi is an Iranian football defender who currently plays for Iranian football club Shahr Khodro in the Persian Gulf Pro League.

Club career

Padideh
Faramarzi joined Padideh late in December 2014 with a three-years contract. He made his debut for Padideh in 2014–15 Iran Pro League against Esteghlal as a starter.

International career

U20
He was part of the Iran U–20 team during the 2012 AFC U-19 Championship qualification, 2012 CIS Cup, 2012 AFF U-19 Youth Championship and 2012 AFC U-19 Championship.

U23
He was invited to the Iran U-23 training camp by Nelo Vingada in preparation for Incheon 2014, and 2016 AFC U-22 Championship (Summer Olympic qualification).

Club career statistics

References

External links
 Mohammad Ali Faramarzi at IranLeague.ir

1994 births
Living people
Iranian footballers
Shahr Khodro F.C. players
Iran under-20 international footballers
Association football fullbacks
People from Shiraz
Sportspeople from Fars province